Roman Kaděra (born 9 February 1973) is a Czech professional ice hockey player who played with HC Slovan Bratislava in the Slovak Extraliga.

Kaděra also played previously for HC Olomouc, HC Vítkovice, HC Oceláři Třinec, HC Slavia Praha, HC Znojemští Orli, HC Chemopetrol Litvínov and HC Dukla Jihlava.

Career statistics

References

1973 births
Living people
HC Vítkovice players
HC Oceláři Třinec players
HC Litvínov players
HC Slavia Praha players
HC Dukla Jihlava players
HC Slovan Bratislava players
Czech ice hockey right wingers
Sportspeople from Jihlava
Czech expatriate ice hockey players in Slovakia
Czech expatriate ice hockey players in Switzerland
Czech expatriate ice hockey players in Germany